This list contains an overview Cultural Properties of the Philippines in Angono, Rizal.

|}

Rizal, Angono